Žitence is a settlement in the Municipality of Sveti Jurij v Slovenskih Goricah in northeastern Slovenia. It lies in the upper part of the valley of Velka Creek, a left tributary of the Pesnica River in the Slovene Hills. The area is part of the traditional region of Styria. The municipality is now included in the Drava Statistical Region.

References

External links
Žitence at Geopedia

Populated places in the Municipality of Sveti Jurij v Slovenskih Goricah